Green Township is one of 13 townships in Grant County, Indiana, United States. As of the 2010 census, its population was 500 and it contained 225 housing units.

Geography

Unincorporated towns
 Normal
 Point Isabel
 Rigdon
(This list is based on USGS data and may include former settlements.)

Adjacent townships
 Sims Township (north)
 Franklin Township (northeast)
 Liberty Township (east)
 Boone Township, Madison County (southeast)
 Duck Creek Township, Madison County (south)
 Wildcat Township, Tipton County (southwest)
 Union Township, Howard County (west)
 Jackson Township, Howard County (northwest)

Major highways

Airports and landing strips
 Dupouy Airport

References
 
 United States Census Bureau cartographic boundary files

External links
 Indiana Township Association
 United Township Association of Indiana

Townships in Grant County, Indiana
Townships in Indiana